Ɗ (minuscule: ɗ) is a letter of the Latin alphabet. The lower case,  represents a voiced dental implosive or a voiced alveolar implosive in the International Phonetic Alphabet. It is used with the same value in the orthographies of various languages, notably some African languages, such as Fula and Hausa, also in Sindhi and used in Shona from 1931–1955.

The upper case Ɗ is formed from D with the addition of a hook, or as in Shona is a larger form of the lower case letter.

In Unicode, the upper case is in the Latin Extended B range (U+018A), and the lower case is in the IPA range (U+0257).

Usage
The letter is used in the following alphabets:
Africa Alphabet
African reference alphabet
Pan-Nigerian alphabet
Alphabets for the following specific languages:
Fula (see also Fula alphabets)
Hausa

External links
Practical Orthography of African Languages
"Latin Extended B: Range 0180-024F" (Unicode code chart)
"IPA Extensions: Range 0250-02AF" (Unicode code chart)

Phonetic transcription symbols
Latin letters with diacritics